Qarhd and al-Fardat is a sub-district located in Al Ashah District, 'Amran Governorate, Yemen. Qarhd and al-Fardat had a population of 2623 according to the 2004 census.

References 

Sub-districts in Al Ashah District